Jean Martinet (died 1672) was a French lieutenant-colonel and Inspector General, and one of the first great drill masters of modern times. Martinet served during the reign of Louis XIV and made way to French conquest in the Holy Roman Empire. He was a severe drillmaster, which made him unpopular among his troops. Martinet revolutionized the early modern army by instituting a standardized system capable of turning raw recruits into a disciplined fighting force, thereby eliminating the mercenaries and soldiers-of-fortune who had been the mainstays of earlier armies. He also introduced the bayonet into the French army and the depot system, which put a stop to the army feeding off the enemy land, making war more humane. The English word martinet derives from the general's last name.

History records that Martinet was eventually killed by friendly fire, in the beginning of Franco-Dutch War, while leading an infantry assault at the siege of Duisburg.

Notes

External links
Article on Jean Martinet
Etymology of the word martinet on Dictionary.com

1672 deaths
French military personnel of the Franco-Dutch War
Military personnel killed by friendly fire
17th-century soldiers
17th-century French people
Year of birth unknown
Louis XIV
French colonels